Seppo Väli-Klemelä (born 13 November 1949) is a Finnish orienteering competitor. He received a silver medal in the relay event at the 1974 World Orienteering Championships in Viborg, together with Hannu Mäkirinta, Markku Salminen and Risto Nuuros.

See also
 List of orienteers
 List of orienteering events

References

Year of birth missing (living people)
Living people
Finnish orienteers
Male orienteers
Foot orienteers
World Orienteering Championships medalists